Michurina is a rural locality (a settlement) in Timiryazevskoye Rural Settlement of Maykopsky District, Russia. The population was 79 as of 2018. There are 2 streets.

Geography 
Michurina is located 9 km south of Tulsky (the district's administrative centre) by road. Shuntuk is the nearest rural locality.

References 

Rural localities in Maykopsky District